Listeriosis is an infectious but not contagious disease caused by the bacterium Listeria monocytogenes, far more common in domestics animals (domestic mammals and poultry), especially ruminants, than in human beings. It can also occur in feral animals—among others, game animals—as well as in poultry and other birds.

The causative bacterium lives in the soil and in poorly made silage, and is acquired by ingestion. It is not contagious; over the course of a 30-year observation period of sheep disease in Morocco, the disease only appeared in the late 2000s (decade) when feeding bag-ensiled corn became common. In Iceland, the disease is called "silage sickness".

The disease is sporadic, but can occur as farm outbreaks in ruminants.

Three main forms are usually recognized throughout the affected species:
 encephalitis, the most common form in ruminants. Meningitis or meningoencephalitis are possibilities.
 late abortion
 gastrointestinal sepsis with liver damage, in monogastric species as well as in preruminant calves and lambs

Listeriosis in animals can sometimes be cured with antibiotics (tetracyclines and benzyl penicillin) when diagnosed early. Goats, for example, can be treated upon noticing facial paralysis, but is generally fatal.

Listeriosis in sheep

In sheep, the disease is also called "circling disease". The most obvious signs for the veterinarians are neurological, especially lateral deviation of the neck and head.

References

Further reading

External links
 Listeriosis in Cattle
 Description of the disease in the Merck Veterinary Manual

Animal bacterial diseases
Listeriosis